Thousand Lights is a constituency of the legislative assembly of the Indian state of Tamil Nadu. Its State Assembly Constituency number is 20. It forms a part of the Chennai Central Lok Sabha constituency for national elections to the Parliament of India. It is one of the 234 State Legislative Assembly Constituencies in Tamil Nadu.

Overview
As per orders of the Delimitation Commission, No. 20 Thousand Lights Assembly constituency is composed of Ward 76-78,107-110,112-114,118 & 119 of Greater Chennai Corporation

Madras State

Tamil Nadu

Election results

2021

2016

2011

2006

2001

1996

1991

1989

1984

1980

1977

1971

1967

1962

1957

1952

Location in context

References 

 

Assembly constituencies of Tamil Nadu
Politics of Chennai